Tri-City Christian School is a private Christian school located in Vista, California. 
Founded in 1971, the school
serves approximately 650 students, from preschool through high school, with the
mission of "training up spiritual champions for Jesus Christ." Tri-City Christian School is accredited by the Western Association of Schools and Colleges (WASC) and the Association of Christian Schools International (ACSI).

Athletics
The official school mascot is the Eagle. Depending on the sport, Tri-City Christian High School competes in the Coastal Conference and Pacific League within the San Diego California Scholastic Federation. Following is a list of the sports offered at the high school:

Men's:
 Baseball (Varsity)
 Basketball (Varsity)
 Basketball (JV)
 Football (Varsity)
 Football (JV)
 Golf (Varsity)
 Soccer (Varsity)
 Tennis (Varsity)
 Track & Field (Varsity)
Women's:
 Basketball (Varsity)
 Cheer (JV & Varsity)
 Soccer (Varsity)
 Tennis (Varsity)
 Track & Field (Varsity)
 Volleyball (Varsity)
 Volleyball (JV)
 Volleyball (Frosh/Soph)
Junior High students also get to participate in many of the aforementioned sports. Tri-City Christian School also offers sports for its elementary students. The co-ed program, which is divided into multiple six-week sessions, is called Soaring Eagles and teaches the basics of football, soccer, basketball and more.

Tri-City Christian League & CIF Championships

Boys Basketball

Girls Volleyball

Boys Cross Country

Girls Softball

Boys Volleyball

Cheerleading

Football

Girls Basketball

Girls Tennis

Girls Soccer

Boys Track

Spiritual life 
Tri-City Christian School incorporates a biblical worldview into its curriculum. Faith is also encouraged through daily prayer, weekly chapels, service projects and missions trips. All teachers, staff and administrators agree to the schools statement of faith, which is decided upon by its founding church, Tri-City Church in Vista, California.

References

External links 
 Tri-City Christian School Official Web Site

Christian schools in California
High schools in San Diego County, California
Private high schools in California
Private middle schools in California
Vista, California